Donal O'Neill may refer to:

 Donal O'Neill or Domhnall Ó Néill, various kings of Tír Eóghain
 Donal O'Neill (Gaelic footballer) (born 1988), Gaelic footballer for Galway
 Donal O'Neill (swimmer), Irish swimmer